The Wexford Intermediate A Hurling Championship (known for sponsorship reasons as the Top Oil Intermediate A Hurling Championship) is an annual hurling competition contested by mid-tier Wexford GAA clubs. The Wexford County Board of the Gaelic Athletic Association has organised it since 2012.

Tara Rocks are the title-holders (2021) defeating Liam Mellows in the Final.

History

The Wexford Intermediate A Hurling Championship dates back to 2012. It was the fourth championship to be established in Wexford following the Wexford Senior Hurling Championship in 1889, the Wexford Junior Hurling Championship in 1903 and the Wexford Intermediate Hurling Championship in 1930.

Gusserane O'Rahilly's defeated Craanford by 4-20 to 1-09 in the 2020 championship decider.

Format

The series of games are played during the summer and autumn months with the county final currently being played in October. The championship features a group stage before the top-ranking teams complete a knock-out series of games. Each year the winners of the Wexford Junior Hurling Championship are promoted to the Intermediate A championship with one team being relegated each year to the Junior level. 

Twelve clubs currently participate in the Wexford Intermediate A Championship.

Participating teams

• St Mary's Rosslare

• Craanford

• Our Lady's Island

• Liam Mellows

• Tara Rocks

• Oulart–The Ballagh (second team)

• Shelmaliers (second team)

• Duffry Rovers

• Shamrocks 

• Geraldine O'Hanrahans

• St Martin's (second team) (Junior Champions)

•St Patrick's Camolin

Honours

The winners of the Intermediate A championship are promoted to the Intermediate Championship (2nd tier) and participate in the Leinster Junior Hurling Championship. One team is relegated from the Intermediate Championship each season to take their place

List of finals

References

1
Intermediate hurling county championships
Wexford GAA club championships